The Meghalaya women's cricket team is a women's cricket team that represents the Indian state of Meghalaya. They were formed in 2012, and have competed in the Indian women's domestic system since the 2018–19 season, in the Women's Senior One Day Trophy and the Senior Women's T20 League.

History
Meghalaya Women first played in 2012, in the BCCI Associate Members Women's Tournament, playing four matches, losing two with two matches curtailed by rain. The team joined the full Indian domestic system ahead of the 2018–19 season, after an expansion of teams in Indian domestic cricket. In their first season, they competed in the Senior Women's One Day League, finishing 3rd out of 9 in the Plate competition, and in the Senior Women's T20 League, finishing 6th out of 7 in their group.

The following season, 2019–20, Meghalaya again finished 6th in their group in the Senior Women's T20 League. However, in the Senior Women's One Day League the team finished 3rd in the Plate Competition and gained promotion, with 7 wins from their 9 matches. The following season, 2020–21, with only the One Day League going ahead, Meghalaya finished bottom of Group E in the Elite Competition, losing all five of their matches, therefore being relegated to the Plate Group. They finished third in the Plate Group of the One Day Trophy in 2021–22, but lost all of their matches in Elite Group A of the T20 Trophy. In 2022–23, the side won just won match, in the T20 Trophy.

Seasons

Women's Senior One Day Trophy

Senior Women's T20 League

See also
 Meghalaya cricket team

References

Women's cricket teams in India
Cricket in Meghalaya
Cricket clubs established in 2012
2012 establishments in Meghalaya